The Đông Dương tạp chí (1913-1919), was a Vietnamese quốc ngữ newspaper in Hanoi founded by François-Henri Schneider and Nguyễn Văn Vĩnh. The paper was technically owned by François-Henri Schneider, since only a Frenchman could obtain a license to publish a newspaper, Its French sister paper was France-Indochine.

Schneider had earlier been involved with founding the Lục Tỉnh Tân Văn (1907, Six Provinces News, Chinese 六省新聞) another Vietnamese newspaper published in Saigon, behind which stood the industrialist Gilbert Trần Chánh Chiếu.

References 

 
 

Vietnamese-language newspapers
Defunct newspapers published in Vietnam
Mass media in Hanoi
Newspapers established in 1913
Publications disestablished in 1919